The CPC Building, also known as Chinese Petroleum Building is a 23-storey,  high-rise office building completed in 2002 and located in Xinyi Special District, Taipei, Taiwan.

See also 
 Taipei Century Plaza
 Shin Kong Manhattan Building
 Xinyi Special District

References

2002 establishments in Taiwan
Office buildings completed in 2002
Skyscraper office buildings in Taipei
Buildings and structures in Taipei
Xinyi Special District